The Israeli Labor Party, commonly known as HaAvoda, is a social democratic and Zionist political party in Israel. The party was established in 1968 by a merger of Mapai, Ahdut HaAvoda, and Rafi. Until 1977, all Israeli Prime Ministers were affiliated with the Labor movement. The current party leader is Merav Michaeli, who was elected in January 2021.

The Labor Party is associated with supporting the Israeli–Palestinian peace process, pragmatic foreign affairs policies and social-democratic economic policies. The party is a member of the Progressive Alliance and is an observer member of the Party of European Socialists. The party was also a member of the Socialist International until May 2020.

History

Dominant political party 1968–1977

The foundations for the formation of the Israeli Labor Party were laid shortly before the 1965 Knesset elections when Mapai, the largest left-wing party in the country and the dominant partner in every government since independence, formed an alliance with Ahdut HaAvoda. Mapai's Arab satellite lists followed the merger. The alliance was an attempt by Mapai to shore up the party's share of the vote following a break-away of eight MKs (around a fifth of Mapai's Knesset faction) led by former Prime Minister David Ben-Gurion to form a new party, Rafi, in protest against Mapai's failure to approve a change to the country's proportional representation electoral system.

The alliance, called the Labor Alignment won 45 seats in the elections, and was able to form the government in coalition with the National Religious Party, Mapam, the Independent Liberals, Poalei Agudat Yisrael, Progress and Development and Cooperation and Brotherhood. After the Six-Day War broke out, Rafi and Gahal joined the coalition.

On 23 January 1968, Mapai, Ahdut HaAvoda and Rafi (with the exception of Ben-Gurion, who formed the National List in protest) merged into one body, creating the Israeli Labor Party. On 28 January 1969, the party allied itself with Mapam, the alliance becoming known as the Alignment.

As the largest faction within the Alignment, Labor came to dominate it. Mapam left during the eighth Knesset, but rejoined shortly afterwards.

During the 1970s, the welfare state was expanded under successive Labor governments, with increases in pension benefits and the creation of new social security schemes such as disability insurance and unemployment insurance in 1970, children's insurance in 1975, vacation pay for adopting parents in 1976, a Family Allowance for Veterans in 1970, a benefit for Prisoners of Zion in 1973, and a mobility benefit and a Volunteers' Rights benefit in 1975. During 1975–76, a modest program of housing rehabilitation was launched in a dozen or so older neighbourhoods, while the Sick Leave Compensation Law of 1976 provided for compensation in cases when employees were absent from work because of illness.

Opposition and comeback 1977–2001

In the 1977 elections, Labor ended up in opposition for the first time. In the 1984 elections, Labor joined a national unity government with Likud, with the post of Prime Minister rotating between the two parties.

Mapam broke away again during the eleventh Knesset, angry at Shimon Peres's decision to form a national unity government with Likud. Although the Independent Liberals merged into the Alignment in the 1980s, they had no Knesset representation at the time.

On 7 October 1991, the Alignment ceased to exist, with all factions formally merged into the Labor Party. At this time, the Likud government faced numerous problems, such as economic problems, the challenge of assimilating a large influx of immigrants from the former Soviet Union, serious tensions with the American government led by President George H. W. Bush and internal division. Led by Yitzhak Rabin, Labor won the 1992 elections and formed the government, together with Meretz and Shas. In domestic policy, the Labor-led government introduced various measures to improve levels of social protection. Better provisions were introduced for single parents and people with disabilities, while income support entitlements were liberalised. 

The 1994 Law to Reduce Poverty and Income Inequality (which was extended a year later) increased income maintenance grants to needy families, particularly benefitting those sections of society most vulnerable to poverty. In 1995, a national health insurance policy was implemented, making access to health care a right for all Israelis.

Various measures were also introduced to bring greater progressivity into the system of collection of national insurance contributions. A maternity grant for adopting mothers was introduced, together with old-age insurance for housewives, a minimum unemployment allowance, and a partial injury allowance. In addition, investments were made in numerous development projects while affirmative action programmes were launched to hire Palestinian citizens in the public sector, the Ministry of Interior increased the budgets for Arab local councils, and the Ministry of Education increased the budget for Arab education.

The subsequent role of Labor became to a large extent tied to the Oslo Accords, based on the principle "land for peace". The Oslo Accords led to a vote of confidence, which the Government won with a margin of 61–50 (8 abstained). Several MKs from the Government parties declined to support the Government, but on the other hand, the Arab parties came to its rescue. Due to the lack of a constitution in Israel, the Government was able to implement the accords with a thin margin.

Rabin's decision to advance peace talks with the Palestinians to the point of signing the Oslo Accords led to his assassination by Yigal Amir in 1995. Peres decided to call early elections in 1996 to give him a mandate for advancing the peace process. However, his ploy failed; although Labor won the most seats in the Knesset election, he lost to the election for Prime Minister to Benjamin Netanyahu following a wave of suicide bombings by Hamas. Netanyahu and Likud were thus able to form the government.

With his coalition falling apart, Netanyahu decided to call early elections in 1999. Ehud Barak won the internal primaries, and was nominated as the Labor candidate for Prime Minister. Meanwhile, the party entered an electoral alliance with Meimad and Gesher called One Israel. Barak won the Prime Minister election, whilst One Israel won the Knesset elections, albeit with only 26 seats.

Barak started by forming a 75-member coalition, together with Shas, Meretz, Yisrael BaAliyah, the National Religious Party, and United Torah Judaism. The coalition with religious parties (NRP, Shas, and UTJ) caused tensions with the secularist Meretz, who quit the coalition after a disagreement with Shas over the authority of the Deputy Education Minister. The rest of the parties left before the Camp David 2000 summit.

Decline since 2001
Following the October 2000 riots and the violence of the Second Intifada, Barak resigned from office. He then lost a special election for Prime Minister to Likud's Ariel Sharon. However, Labor remained in Sharon's coalition as he formed a national unity government with Likud, Labor, Shas, Yisrael BaAliyah and United Torah Judaism, and were given two of the most important cabinet portfolios; Peres was appointed Minister of Foreign Affairs and Benjamin Ben-Eliezer was made Defense Minister. Labor supported Operation Defensive Shield, which was conducted in April 2002 against Palestinians in the West Bank. After harsh criticism that Peres and Ben-Elizer were "puppets" of Sharon and not promoting the peace process, Labor quit the government in 2003.

Prior to the 2003 elections, Amram Mitzna won the party primaries, and led the party into the election with a platform that included unilateral withdrawal from the Gaza Strip. The party was routed in the elections, winning only 19 seats, whilst Sharon's Likud won 38 (40 after Yisrael BaAliyah merged into the party). Subsequently, due to internal opposition, Mitzna resigned from the party leadership, and soon afterwards was replaced by Shimon Peres. 

Sharon invited Labor into the coalition to shore up support for the disengagement plan (effectively Mitzna's policy which he had earlier lambasted) after the National Union and the National Religious Party had left the government.

On 8 November 2005, Shimon Peres was replaced as the leader of the Labor party by the election of left-wing Histadrut union leader Amir Peretz in an internal Labor party ballot. Critics of Labor have argued that, over the years, the party had abandoned its socialist heritage in favor of economic and business elites, and had passed the mantle of custodian of the underprivileged to right-wing and religious parties. Peretz stated his intention to reassert Labor's traditional socialist policies, and took the party out of the government. This prompted Sharon to resign and call for new elections in March 2006. Prior to the election, the political map had been redrawn, as Sharon and the majority of Likud's MKs, together with a number of Labor MKs, including Shimon Peres, and some from other parties, had formed the new political party Kadima. In the elections Labor won 19 seats, making it the second largest party after Kadima. It joined Ehud Olmert's Kadima-led government, with Peretz appointed Defense Minister. Labor's main coalition demand and campaign promise was raising the minimum wage.

On 28 May 2007, a leadership election resulted in Ehud Barak and Ami Ayalon defeating Peretz who was pushed into third place. In the run-off election (required as neither Barak nor Ayalon received over 40% of the vote), Barak was re-elected as party chairman. Despite stating that he would withdraw the party from the government unless Olmert resigned, Barak remained in government and took over as Defense Minister.

Prior to the 2009 elections Labor and Meimad ended their alliance, with Meimad ultimately running a joint list with the Green Movement (which did not pass the electoral threshold). Several prominent members left the party, including Ami Ayalon, and Efraim Sneh (who formed Yisrael Hazaka). In the elections, Labor was reduced to just 13 seats, making it the fourth largest party behind Kadima, Likud and Yisrael Beiteinu.

Analysing the downfall of the once dominant political party in Israel, Efraim Inbar of the Begin-Sadat Center for Strategic Studies points to several factors. By forfeiting identification with the establishment and building of the State of Israel, symbolised by a predilection for military service and by the settling of the land of Israel, Labor lost its most important asset. 
Deserting the Zionist symbol of Jerusalem, by showing willingness to cede part of it to the Palestinians was an ill-fated move. Their association with the Oslo Accords meant that they could not avoid being discredited by its failure. Demographic factors have worked against Labor, as the growing Sefardi population, as well as the recent Russian-Jewish immigrants, have largely voted for other parties. Attempts to gain the support of the Israeli Arab voters have damaged the image of the party, and yielded no harvest.

On 17 January 2011, disillusionment with party leader Ehud Barak, over his support for coalition policies, especially regarding the peace process, led to Barak's resignation from the Labor Party with four other Knesset members to establish a new "centrist, Zionist and democratic" party, Independence. Following this move, all Labor Party government ministers resigned.

Two days after the split, a group of prominent members of Israel's business, technology, and cultural communities including Jerusalem Venture Partners founder Erel Margalit founded the "Avoda Now" movement calling for a revival of the Labor Party. The movement launched a public campaign calling the people to support the Labor Party, with the aim of renewing its institutions, restore its social values, and choose new dynamic leadership.

Shelly Yachimovich was elected leader in 2011 saying "I promise that we will work together. This is just the beginning of a new start for Israeli society." She was congratulated by many in the party including her one-time rival Amir Peretz. Yachimovich was replaced as leader by Isaac Herzog in 2013.

In the 2013 legislative election held on 22 January 2013, Labor received 11.39% of the national vote,
winning 15 seats.

On 10 December 2014, party leader Isaac Herzog and Tzipi Livni, leader and founder of the Hatnuah party, announced an electoral alliance to contest the upcoming legislative election. In the 2015 legislative election on 7 March 2015, the joint list Zionist Union received 24 seats in the Knesset, of which 19 belong to the Labor Party. Both parties remained independent parties while both represented by the Zionist Union faction in the Knesset. The partnership continued after Avi Gabbay was elected chairman of the party on 10 July 2017, until 1 January 2019, when Gabbay announced the dissolution of the union unilaterally.

On 10 July 2018, the Labor Party suspended its membership of the Socialist International after the international adopted a policy of BDS towards Israel.

Labor's support collapsed in the April 2019 legislative election, being reduced to only 4,43% of votes and 6 seats, marking it as the worst result in the party's history. Anger at Gabbay intensified, with poor election results, and negotiating with the right to join a Netanyahu led government. Longtime party member Peretz criticized Gabbay, tweeting "We will not enter or sit in his [Netanyahu] government. Every other option is a violation of everything we promised to the public" Gabbay resigned in June.

In July 2019, Amir Peretz was elected as the new leader of the Labor party. A few weeks later, on 18 July 2019, ahead of the September 2019 election, Amir Peretz merged the party with the Gesher party, giving Gesher multiple spots on Labor's candidate list.

On 12 January 2020, Labor announced that it was negotiating a joint list with Meretz to prevent the possibility of either party not making the electoral threshold and not entering the Knesset. Labor and Meretz announced a joint run on 13 January 2020, with the Labor party central committee voting in favor of ratification of the alliance the following day. Meretz approved the alliance on 14 January. The alliance submitted its list on 15 January under the name Labor-Gesher-Meretz.

In March 2020, Gesher's only MK Orly Levy announced that she was splitting from the union due to their support of Benny Gantz's efforts to set up a minority government with the Joint List, with him as Prime Minister. Gantz later abandoned that effort and instead joined a "national unity coronavirus government" headed by Benjamin Netanyahu. After repeatedly promising not to join a government headed by Netanyahu, Peretz decided to bring Labor into that coalition headed by Netanyahu to "promote social justice" along with Gantz.

On 22 April 2020, it was announced that Labor Party leader Amir Peretz would serve as Israel's Economic Minister as a result of a coalition agreement which was made following the 2020 Israeli legislative election and will coordinate with Blue and White on parliamentary matters and policy issues. Despite agreeing to join the new government, Peretz also stated that he and other Labor MKs will still vote against a proposed West Bank annexation plan. On 26 April 2020, 64.2% of the Labor Party's 3,840 central committee members approved of Peretz's decision to join the new government. During the coalition talks, the party was under negotiations with Blue and White to implement a merger. On 17 May 2020, Peretz was officially sworn in at the new Israeli economic minister. Labor member Itzik Shmuli also joined the Israeli government after being sworn in as Israel's Minister of Welfare.

Peretz decided to not run for re-election in the 2021 election and also resigned as leader. In the consequent leadership election, Merav Michaeli (who did not join the Netanyahu government) was elected leader. Labor, which was struggling to cross the threshold in polls taken before Michaeli became leader, increased their share of seats to 7. The party subsequently joined the new government. Michaeli was re-elected leader ahead of the 2022 election. This was the first time the party re-elected its leader since primaries were held starting in 1992. In the 2022 elections the party was reduced to four seats.

Political principles

Past
Mapai evolved from the socialist Poale Zion movement and adhered to the Socialist Zionist ideology promulgated by Nahum Syrkin and Ber Borochov. Under Ben-Gurion's leadership (1930–1954), Mapai focused mainly on a Zionist agenda, as establishing a homeland for the Jewish people was seen as the most urgent issue.

After the founding of the state of Israel, Mapai engaged in nation building—the establishment of the Israel Defense Forces (while dismantling every other armed group), the establishment of many settlements, the settling of more than 1,000,000 Jewish immigrants and the desire to unite all the inhabitants of Israel under a new Zionist Jewish Israeli culture (an ideology known as the "Melting pot" כור היתוך).

Labor in the past was more hawkish on security and defense issues than it is now. During its years in office, Israel fought the 1956 Sinai War, the Six-Day War and the Yom Kippur War.

Current
While originally a democratic socialist party, Labor has evolved into a programme that supports a mixed economy with strong social welfare programmes. In November 2005, Amir Peretz, leader of the social-democratic One Nation which had merged into Labor after a split in 1999, was elected chairman of the party, defeating Shimon Peres. Under Peretz, especially in the 2006 electoral campaign, the party took a significant ideological turn, putting social and economic issues on top of its agenda, and advocating a social democratic approach (including increases in minimum wage and social security payments), in sharp contrast to the economically liberal policies led by former Finance Minister Benjamin Netanyahu.

In the post–Cold War era, the party's foreign policy retains a strong orientation toward the United States (especially the Democratic Party), and its security policy maintains that a permanent peace with the Palestinians can only be based on agreements that are enforceable. Labor supports a two-state solution and the creation of an independent, demilitarized Palestinian state.

On social issues, Labor supports same-sex marriage, the legalisation of cannabis, advancing surrogacy rights for gay couples and limited public transportation on Shabbat.

Labor is committed to the continued existence of Israel as a Jewish and democratic state. It believes in maintaining a strong defense force and also supports the promotion of individual human rights. It supports most Supreme Court decisions on the latter issue, as well as the adoption of a written constitution that would entrench human rights. The party opposed the Nation State Bill in 2018, and since its passing has pledged to adding a clause emphasising equality for all citizens.

Party leaders

Leadership election process
The rules adopted in 1963 by the preceding Mapai party for electing leaders saw the party's leader elected by a vote of its Central Committee. This initially remained the case with the Labor Party when it succeeded Mapai. Beginning with the 1977 leadership election, the party shifted to electing its leaders by a vote of the party's convention delegates. Following Rabin's resignation, only months after the February 1977 leadership election, the party opted against holding another convention vote, and instead selected Peres as its new leader by a vote of its Central Committee. A vote of convention delegates was again used in the 1980 leadership election.

At the party's 5th convention, rule change was adopted which shifted the election of party leaders to a vote of the party's general membership. As a result, since 1992, Labor Party leaders have been through party membership votes, with excepting circumstances. Excepting circumstances arose after the November 1995 assassination of Rabin, which saw the a vote of the party's Central Committee used to install Peres as the party's new leader. Excepting circumstances again arose in 2003, when an internal vote of the party's Central Committee was used to select Shimon Peres to serve as they party's interim leader until a later vote for a new permanent leader.

Other prominent members
Prominent former members include:

Election results

Knesset

Prime Minister

Current MKs

See also
 Israeli Labor Party primaries

References

External links 

  
 Israel Labor Party Knesset website 
 Labor-Meimad Knesset website 
 Unofficial Labor Forum website 
 The Dangerous Lives of Doves in Israel By Kevin Peraino | NEWSWEEK Published 10 January 2009 From the magazine issue dated 19 January 2009

 
1968 establishments in Israel
Centre-left parties in Asia
Political parties in Israel
Israel
Left-wing nationalist parties
Parties related to the Party of European Socialists
Political parties established in 1968
Progressive Alliance
Social democratic parties in Israel
Zionist political parties in Israel
Labor Zionism